The Cape Henry Lighthouses are a pair of lighthouses at Cape Henry, the landform marking the southern entrance to Chesapeake Bay in the U.S. state of Virginia.  The location has long been important for the large amount of ocean-going shipping traffic for the harbors, its rivers, and shipping headed to ports on the bay. The original lighthouse was the first authorized by the U.S. government, dating from 1792.  It was also the first federal construction project under the Constitution, for an original contract amount of $15,200 (an additional $2,500 was required to finish the lighthouse). A second lighthouse was built and completed in 1881 a short distance away after concern arose about the stability of the first.  Both towers of the light station were designated a National Historic Landmark in 1970.

History
The first work of the new U.S. Federal government, the first Cape Henry lighthouse was built of Aquia and Rappahannock sandstone by John McComb Jr. and was completed in October, 1792. McComb was one of the architects involved in the construction of New York City Hall and would go on to design other lighthouses. The lighthouse's design was based on the 1767 Cape Henlopen Light.  The lighthouse was damaged by Confederate forces during the American Civil War, but was repaired by Union forces in 1863, who depended on the light for navigation.  In the 1870s, concerns about the condition and safety of the old Lighthouse at Cape Henry following a lightning strike that caused large cracks in the structure led to the construction of a new, taller, lighthouse at Cape Henry (pictured to the right) in 1881, which stands 350 feet to the northeast of the original tower. The old tower remained standing, used as a daymark and as a basis for triangulation.  The lighthouse was fully automated in 1983 and remains in use today.

Description
In 1798, Benjamin Latrobe visited Cape Henry Lighthouse and described it as "an octangular truncated pyramid of eight sides, rising 90 feet to the light..."  The Old Cape Henry Lighthouse is 26 feet in diameter at its base, and 16 feet at its top.   It was built with Aquia Creek sandstone from the same source as the White House.

It is the only lighthouse on the Virginia coast that is still equipped with a first-order Fresnel lens.

Preservation
The older lighthouse was acquired in 1930 by Preservation Virginia (formerly known as the Association for the Preservation of Virginia Antiquities). A brick lining and an iron stairway have been added to the interior. The lighthouse is open to the public and a fine view can be enjoyed from its observation platform.  It was designated a National Historic Landmark on January 29, 1964.  In 2002 the American Society of Civil Engineers designated the lighthouse a National Historic Civil Engineering Landmark.

The lighthouses are located in the city of Virginia Beach within the boundaries of Joint Expeditionary Base East, a Navy base.  The Cape Henry Memorial is adjacent to the lighthouses.

See also
 First Landing State Park
 Boston Light for more on lighthouse firsts
 List of National Historic Landmarks in Virginia
 National Register of Historic Places listings in Virginia Beach, Virginia

References

External links

 Lighthousefriends: Cape Henry Lighthouse
 Cape Henry Lighthouse webpage on the Preservation Virginia website
 Chesapeake Bay Lighthouse Project - Old Cape Henry Light
 Chesapeake Bay Lighthouse Project - New Cape Henry Light

Lighthouses on the National Register of Historic Places in Virginia
National Historic Landmarks in Virginia
Octagonal buildings in the United States
Buildings and structures in Virginia Beach, Virginia
Lighthouses completed in 1792
Lighthouses completed in 1881
Historic Civil Engineering Landmarks
National Historic Landmark lighthouses
National Register of Historic Places in Virginia Beach, Virginia
1881 establishments in Virginia
John McComb Jr. buildings